Parliamentary elections were held in Chile on 6 March 1949. Although the Social Christian Conservative Party received the most votes in the Senate elections, the Liberal Party won the most seats, whilst the Radical Party remained the largest party in the Chamber of Deputies.

Electoral system
The term length for Senators was eight years, with around half of the Senators elected every four years. This election saw 20 of the 45 Senate seats up for election.

Campaign
Having won 15 seats in the Chamber of Deputies in the 1945 elections, the Communist Party was banned in 1948.

Results

Senate

Chamber of Deputies

References

Elections in Chile
1949 in Chile
Chile
March 1949 events in South America
Election and referendum articles with incomplete results